Rare Birds is the third studio album by American musician and producer Jonathan Wilson. It was released on March 2, 2018 under Bella Union.

Production
The album was self-produced by Wilson at his Five Star Studios in Echo Park, Los Angeles.

Release
On December 5, 2017, Jonathan Wilson revealed the new album to be released on Bella Union on March 2, 2018. The album has appearances by Lana Del Rey, Laraaji and Father John Misty. The first single to be released from the album, "Over The Midnight" is directed by Andrea Nakhla.

Critical reception
Rare Birds was met with "generally favorable" reviews from critics. At Metacritic, which assigns a weighted average rating out of 100 to reviews from mainstream publications, this release received an average score of 74, based on 13 reviews. Aggregator Album of the Year gave the release a 74 out of 100 based on a critical consensus of 12 reviews.

Thom Jurek from AllMusic explained that the album "is dizzying in ambition and (mostly) dazzling in execution. It offers hours of enjoyment to anyone who takes it on. It's sprawling at nearly 80 minutes, and lavishly packaged.". Andy Gill from The Independent stated: "The lush opacity becomes claustrophobic over his eighty-minute default track length: though frequently sweet and beautiful, one’s ultimately left like Heliogabalus, drowned in rose petals.".

Accolades

Track listing

Charts

Personnel

Musicians
 Jonathan Wilson – primary artist
 Dan Bailey – drums 
 Joey Waronker – drums 
 Jake Blanton – bass 
 Dan Horne – moog bass
 Pete Jacobsen – cello 
 John Kirby – piano 
 Ziad Rabie – saxophone 
 Tom Lea – violin 
 Derek Stein – cello 
 Greg Leisz – guitar 
 Jessica Wolfe – guest vocals 
 Laraaji – gues vocals 
 Josh Tillman – guest vocals 
 Krystle Warren – guest vocals 
 Holly Laessig – guest vocals 
 Omar Velasco – guest vocals 
 Lana Del Rey – guest vocals 
 Ziad Rabie – saxophone
 Jeff Ramuno – piano , mellotron  

Production
 Adam Ayan – mastering
 Dave Cerminara – mixing
 Drew Erickson – string arrangement
 Andrea Nakhla – photographer

References

External links

2018 albums
Jonathan Wilson (musician) albums
Bella Union albums
Albums produced by Jonathan Wilson (musician)